The Book of Commandments is the earliest published book to contain the revelations of Joseph Smith Jr. Text published in the Book of Commandments is now considered scripture by the Church of Jesus Christ of Latter-day Saints (LDS Church) as part of the larger Doctrine and Covenants.

History of the Book of Commandments 
The Book of Commandments was planned as a compilation of  Joseph Smith Jr.'s early prophecies. Smith, leader of the Latter Day Saint movement, gathered several of his revelations for a High Priests council in November 1831. The ten-man council voted to print 10,000 copies, but the actual number of prints was reduced to between three and five thousand.

W. W. Phelps, publisher of the book, ran a press in Independence, Missouri. A faithful Mormon, Phelps also edited an historically important Mormon periodical, The Evening and Morning Star from September 1831 to July 1833. Most revelations in the Book of Commandments were previously published by Phelps in the Star.

The title page of the book reads "A Book of Commandments, for the government of the Church of Christ, organized according to law, on the 6th of April, 1830. / ZION: published by W. W. Phelps & co. / 1833."

On July 20, 1833 an anti-Mormon and pro-slavery mob destroyed the press. The mob, purportedly frightened of Mormon political power, was incensed by an editorial in Phelps's Evening and Morning Star perceived to be abolitionist. Breaking down the door, they razed Phelps's home and business in less than an hour. At that point, 65 revelations of the Book of Commandments, about two thirds the total, were already printed. Totaling 160 pages, most of the uncut and unbound sheets were destroyed in the ensuing fire. However, some neighbors including teenage sisters Caroline and Mary Elizabeth Rollins saved remnants of nearly 100 copies.

Fewer than 30 are known to exist today, including several incomplete versions. Further enhancing the book's scarcity, several copies of the Book of Commandments are held in permanent collections. For example, The Church of Jesus Christ of Latter-day Saints (LDS Church) and the Community of Christ have multiple copies, and the rare books divisions of the University of Utah Marriott Library, Brigham Young University Harold B. Lee Library, The Library of Congress, and the New York Public Library each own a copy. When sold on the open market, the book regularly fetches over $100,000. An incomplete copy changed hands for $200,000 in 2001, and a complete volume sold at auction for $391,000. Rare books dealer Ken Sanders claims a copy was sold privately in Utah for $500,000.

Content of the Book of Commandments 

Many of the revelations in the Book of Commandments were also printed in the official church newspaper Evening and Morning Star, with relatively superficial and typographical edits.

A much more ambitious revision was made in 1835, when all the revelations contained in the Book of Commandments were edited for inclusion in a larger text of Mormon scriptures called the Doctrine and Covenants. In addition to many superficial changes, this latter work contains significant redactions, deletions, and additions of new material to the older revelations, and the nature of these changes has been controversial, in part because these changes are not widely known by Mormon adherents, and in part because the changes have been used by secular Mormon scholars to support a hypothesis that Mormon theology developed gradually, and underwent theological reversals and significant changes. Apologetic scholars tend to minimize the significance of these changes, or to read the two editions of scripture in a way that makes them roughly consistent.

For example, mention of biblical apostles Peter, James, and John imparting Joseph Smith Jr. with the Priesthood is in section 27 of the Doctrine and Covenants, but is omitted from the equivalent chapter in the Book of Commandments.

Secular Mormon scholars argue that these changes reflect the changing doctrines of Joseph Smith, but Mormon apologetic scholars are more likely to hold that the changes are elaborations or clarifications of previously revealed doctrine. For example, a scripture often cited by Mormon critics says,

"...and he has a gift to translate the book and I have commanded him that he shall pretend to no other gift, for I will grant him no other gift." — Book of Commandments 4:2

This passage refers to Joseph Smith in third person. However, the re-numbered Doctrine and Covenants reads:

"...and this is the first gift that I bestowed upon you; and I have commanded that you should pretend to no other gift until my purpose is fulfilled in this; for I will grant unto you no other gift until it is finished." — Doctrine and Covenants 5:4

Secular Mormon scholars generally assert that Smith originally claimed only to be charged with translating the Book of Mormon. According to this view, he had to revise the passage to bring it into accord with his subsequent translation of the Bible and claim to be sole prophet in the church. An apologist would reply that this misunderstanding of the original text is precisely why it had to be clarified.

Book of Commandments chapters and Doctrine and Covenants sections 
Note that the units of the Book of Commandments are chapters, while the Doctrine and Covenants has sections. Chapters of the book correspond exactly to modern D&C sections except for the revisions discussed above.

References

External links

"Book of Commandments" - article from semi-official Encyclopedia of Mormonism.
Melvin J. Petersen, "Preparing Early Revelations for Publication", Ensign, February 1985 - sympathetic article explaining changes between the Book of Commandments and Doctrine and Covenants.
Changing The Book of Commandments: Revelations: Written, Re-Written and Corrected, Rick Branch (1992), The Watchman Expositor, Vol. 9, No. 9, Watchman Fellowship ministry - criticizes the alleged inconsistency of the book.
Joel A. Kuhn "A comparison tool for the LDS Doctrine and Covenants/Book of Commandments"
Scanned Images of the Entire 1833 Book of Commandments and 1835 Doctrine and Covenants.
Saving the Book of Commandments painting by Clark Kelley Price; see also the explanation.
West Virginia and Mormonism Rarest Books Article from West Virginia History about the source of paper used to print the Book of Commandments
Digital scanned copy of an original edition, from The Library of Congress
Digital scanned copy of an original edition, from The Joseph Smith Papers website
Digital scanned copy of the 1884 reprint from HathiTrust

1833 books
1833 in Christianity
Doctrine and Covenants
Latter Day Saint texts
Works by Joseph Smith
Works in the style of the King James Version
Revelation in Mormonism